Gastón Nicolás Reniero (born 18 March 1995) is an Argentine professional footballer who plays as a striker for Argentinos Juniors, on loan from Racing Club de Avellaneda.

Career
San Lorenzo were Reniero's first career club. In August 2016, Reniero joined Almagro of Primera B Nacional on loan. He made his Almagro and senior career debut on 14 September during a Copa Argentina loss at home to Juventud Unida, prior to making his first professional league appearance during a goalless tie with Independiente Rivadavia three days later. On 20 September, Reniero netted his first goal in a 2–1 victory against Santamarina. In total, Reniero featured thirty-nine times in all competitions for Almagro whilst scoring fifteen goals, including a hat-trick in his penultimate match versus Atlético Paraná.

He returned to San Lorenzo ahead of the 2017–18 Argentine Primera División season and subsequently made his league bow on 27 August 2017 in a draw with Racing Club, having previously scored on his club debut for them earlier in the month during a Copa Argentina game against Cipolletti on 15 August.

Career statistics
.

References

External links

1995 births
Living people
Sportspeople from Entre Ríos Province
Argentine people of Italian descent
Argentine footballers
Association football forwards
Argentine Primera División players
Primera Nacional players
San Lorenzo de Almagro footballers
Club Almagro players
Racing Club de Avellaneda footballers
Argentinos Juniors footballers